Bundalong South is a locality in the Shire of Moira local government area in the state of Victoria, Australia. The post office opened as Peechelba on 2 September 1880 and was renamed Bundalong South on 2 July 1883. It closed on 31 March 1966.

References

Towns in Victoria (Australia)
Shire of Moira